Lucerne-Stadt District is one of the two new Wahlkreis formed from the former Lucerne Amt in 2013 in the Canton of Lucerne, Switzerland.

 1992/97 survey gives a total area of  without including certain large lakes, while the 2000 survey includes lakes and gives the higher value.
 Includes the area of Littau which merged into Luzern on 1 January 2010.

Mergers
On 1 January 2010 the municipality of Littau merged into the municipality of Lucerne.

The new Wahlkreis was created on 1 January 2013.

References

Districts of the canton of Lucerne